Roger Vaughan (died by 1615), of Court of Clyro, Radnorshire and Kynnersley, Herefordshire, was a Welsh politician.

He was a Member (MP) of the Parliament of England for Radnorshire in 1572.

References

16th-century births
Year of death missing
16th-century Welsh politicians
People from Radnorshire
People from Herefordshire
English MPs 1572–1583